Zaj was an experimental music and performance art group formed in 1959 in Milan, Italy by composers and intermedia artists Walter Marchetti and Juan Hidalgo with the support of the American composer John Cage. The group received major contributions by different artists from the Spanish avant-garde scene, notably from the writer and diplomat José Luis Castillejo and from the interdisciplinary artist Esther Ferrer. During the 1960s, members of Zaj took part in different Fluxus events organised by George Maciunas. With the help of John Cage and his agent Mimi Johnson, Zaj also toured in different cities in the United States in the late 1970s. The group was disbanded in 1993 by Walter Marchetti.

See also
Musica Elettronica Viva

Sources
 Barber, Llorenç, Juan Hidalgo, Ritmo. Vol. 566, 1986, pp. 112–13, 
 Charles, Daniel, Performance (art et esthétique), Encyclopedia Universalis, France
 Hidalgo, Juan (w. John Cage, Morton Feldman, Leopoldo La Rosa, Walter Marchetti), Rumoriallarotonda, CD booklet (32 pages), ALGA MARGHEN, ITALY, ALGA 031CD, 1998
 La Motte-Haber, Helga de, Die Gruppe Zaj: Cage-Rezeption in romanischen Ländern (Grupo Zaj: Cage reception in Romance countries), Positionen: Beiträge zur Neuen Musik. no. 21, pp. 32–33. Nov 1994, 	
 Leyva Sanjuan, Antonio, Zaj: A conversation with Juan Hidalgo, Crónica. Vol. 3, no. 42, 1991, pp. 32–33, 
 Medina Álvarez, Ángel, Primeras oleadas de vanguardistas en el área de Madrid (The first waves of the avant-garde in the Madrid area), in López-Calo, José (ed.), Spain in Western Music, Madrid, Spain: Ministerio de Cultura, 1987. 403, 504 pp
 Sarmiento, José Antonio, Críticas a un concierto Zaj (Reviews of a concert by Zaj), Cuenca, Spain: Ediciones + 491, 1991

External links
Archivio Conz - Jose Luis Castilejo
Archivio Conz-Juan Hilgado
Archivio Conz- Walter Marchetti
Site of Juan Hidalgo
Interview with Walter Marchetti in Mute Magazine
Conversation between José Luis Castillejo (In French) and André Éric Létourneau - Website of the Canadian Broadcasting Corporation
Interview with Esther Ferrer (in French) in Esse Magazine

Italian artist groups and collectives
Musical groups established in 1959
Italian contemporary artists
1959 establishments in Italy